Star Wars: The Empire Strikes Back is a scrolling shooter video game written by Rex Bradford for the Atari 2600 and published by Parker Brothers in 1982. It was the first licensed Star Wars video game. An Intellivision version was released in 1983.

Gameplay

The player must control Luke Skywalker in a snowspeeder to battle against Imperial AT-AT walkers on the planet Hoth. The objective is to hold off the walkers as long as possible before they blow up the power generator at the Rebels' Echo Base. The difficulty levels included several variables, including the initial speed of the walkers, whether or not the walkers were solid, and whether or not the walkers included a "smart bomb".

The player can destroy a walker by shooting it repeatedly in the head or torso; shots to the legs are ineffective. As the walker is damaged, it changes colors - transitioning from black (undamaged) through various shades of gray, red, and orange to yellow (critically damaged). The player can also destroy the walkers by shooting a small flashing spot that randomly appears during gameplay. On the Intellivision, the walkers require thirty hits to take down, compared to forty-eight hits on the Atari.

The walkers shoot back at the player, whose speeder also changes colors as it receives damage. The player can land a damaged speeder to repair it. On some game levels, the walkers are solid, meaning that the player can crash into them, damaging them and destroying the player. Other levels include a smart bomb which periodically launches from the flashing port on a walker and follows the player for a time. If the player is hit by the smart bomb his speeder is destroyed. If the player survives for 20 minutes the speeder is granted the power of the Force for 20 seconds. When this happens, the speeder flashes colorfully and becomes invulnerable for a short time.

The game ends when the player's fifth speeder is destroyed or when the lead walker reaches Echo Base, destroying it. As the game progresses, the walkers move more rapidly, increasing the difficulty level.

Reception
The game was a commercial success, becoming one of the year's two best-selling video games of 1982 for Parker Brothers, along with Frogger. In 1982, it was reported that both games had sold a combined  cartridges.

Star Wars: The Empire Strikes Back received mixed reviews. It was reviewed in Video magazine shortly after its release. Reviewers praised the game's "zingy graphics" and noted that "the audio-visual effects are absolutely first-rate". Overall they characterized it as "an entertaining fast-paced contest that belongs in the cartridge libraries of most (Atari)VCS owners". That same month, rival publication Video Review magazine ran a review of the game written by science fiction author Harlan Ellison. Ellison blasted the game as a "shamelessly exploitative little toy", "the latest icon of the Imbecile Industry", and a "time-wasting enterprise" with "the potential to emerge as the most virulent electronic botulism of all". According to Ellison, the game has "extremely simple-minded parameters" and it "bore[d] [his] ass off"; however, the brunt of Ellison's criticism came from his dissatisfaction with the game's ending. Because the game's two end-conditions are both failure conditions (either all of the player's units are destroyed or the lead enemy reaches the player's base), Ellison suggested that the game cannot be won and is thus "an analogue for the Myth of Sisyphus" providing "one dreadful life-lesson in those of a youthful intelligence who play it. ... You can only waste your life struggling and struggling".

Ed Driscoll reviewed The Empire Strikes Back in The Space Gamer No. 55. Driscoll commented that "I'd have to say that the good points outweigh the bad, and it is fun to play.  I'd say that this is an excellent start for a company new to the VCS scene.  May the Force be with you!" Computer and Video Games reviewed the game in 1989, giving it a 46% score.

Reviews
Jeux & Stratégie #19

References

External links
 The Empire Strikes Back at Atari Mania
 The Empire Strikes Back at AtariAge
 The Empire Strikes Back at Intellivision Lives
 Gametrailers' Star Wars Retrospective Episode I
Behind The Scenes of Star Wars: The Empire Strikes Back on gamestm 
 

1982 video games
Atari 2600 games
Intellivision games
North America-exclusive video games
Parker Brothers video games
Horizontally scrolling shooters
The Empire Strikes Back video games
Multiplayer and single-player video games
Video games developed in the United States